Zivic is a surname. Notable people with the surname include:

Fritzie Zivic (1913–1984), American world welterweight champion boxer
Jack Zivic (1903–1973), American boxer
Peter Zivic (1901–1987), American boxer

See also
Marko Živić Show, Serbian late-night talk show that aired on Fox televizija